Mwinyi Kazimoto (born 25 December 1988) is a Tanzanian footballer. He plays as a midfielder for Al Markhiya in the Qatari Second Division. He was a member of the Tanzania national football team at the 2013 Africa Cup of Nations qualification.

International career

International goals
Scores and results list Tanzania's goal tally first.

References

External links 
 
 Profile
 Profile

1988 births
Living people
Tanzanian footballers
Tanzania international footballers
Association football midfielders
Al-Markhiya SC players
Tanzanian expatriate footballers
Expatriate footballers in Qatar
People from Dodoma
Tanzania A' international footballers
2009 African Nations Championship players
Tanzanian expatriate sportspeople in Qatar